Zacria is a genus of moths in the  family Sphingidae, containing only one species Zacria vojtechi, which is known from Western Australia.

References

Macroglossini
Monotypic moth genera
Moths described in 2003
Moths of Australia